The Devon and Cornwall Police and Crime Commissioner is the police and crime commissioner, an elected official tasked with setting out the way crime is tackled by Devon and Cornwall Police in the English counties of Devon and Cornwall. The post was created in November 2012, following an election held on 15 November 2012, and replaced the Devon and Cornwall Police Authority. The current incumbent is Alison Hernandez, who represents the Conservative Party.

List of Devon and Cornwall Police and Crime Commissioners

Electoral record

2021 election

2016 election

References

Police and crime commissioners in England